Holy Synod of the Albanian Orthodox Church is the highest governing body of the church of Albanian Orthodox Church.

History 
The Albanian Orthodox Church was declared autocephalous initially by the Congress of Berat, on 10–19 September 1922. Its decisions were recognized by the Albanian government, which had pushed for its development. The "High Ecclesiastical Council" was appointed in Congress, which would temporarily lead the Church. In February 1929 the Holy Synod was formed consisting of:

 Visarion Xhuvani (who was made bishop in Serbia in 1925, by Russian bishops) as Archbishop of Albania and supervisor of the metropolis of Korça,
 Agathangjel Çamçe metropolitan of Berat,
 Ambroz Ikonomi, Metropolitan of Dryinopolis
 Efthim Kosteva, Archbishop Assistant.

On 29 June 1929, at the Second Clergy-Secular Congress held in Korça, the "Statute of the Autocephalous Orthodox Church of Albania" was voted.

The Ecumenical Patriarchate refused to accept these actions, but was willing to give itself self-government and in parallel the use of the Albanian language in worship, preaching and ecclesiastical education. Due to various political developments and dangers from the West, the Patriarchate agreed to discuss the issue of Autocephaly as well. She even sent to Albania for talks with the Albanian authorities the prominent Metropolitan of Trabzon, Chrysanthios, who later became Archbishop of Athens. Chrysanthemum spoke in favor of granting Autocephaly and suggested further progress.

In order to normalize relations with the Ecumenical Patriarchate, the Clergy-Laity Congress convened in Korça, in May 1936, with the participation of representatives from all 4 dioceses (ecclesiastical provinces). Congress apologized to the Patriarchate; talks took place in Athens (13 March 1937) and a commission composed of Albanians went to Constantinople to finally settle the matter.

On 25 December 1948 Archbishop Christopher was forced to leave and the new Archbishop was appointed Pais Vodica, who at that time was bishop of Korça (he had remained a widower). It was also allowed to be held in Tirana, from 5–10 February 1950, the Clergy-Laity Assembly of the Orthodox Church, to vote on the new Statute, which in some points amended the Statute of the year 1929. The Church Hierarchy, after 1952, consisted of the Archbishop of Tirana and all Albania Pais Vodica, the Bishop of Gjirokastra Damian Kokoneshi, from Korça Filothe Duni, from Berat Cyril Naslazi and assistant bishop Sofron Borova. The canonical archbishop Christopher, was held under house arrest and on 19 June 1958 was found dead (according to the official version suffered a heart attack). In March 1966 Paisi died and in April he came to the throne Archbishop Damian. At this time the attempt to trample on religion and its representatives began; as well as the pressure of internment, imprisonment, and murder of clergy and laity.

Orthodox Albanians who settled in America were divided into two groups. One under the direction of Theofan Noli and later under that of Bishop Stefan Lasko, who had connections with the Church of Albania, while the other, under the direction of the Bishop of Lefka, Marko Lipa, who depended on Ecumenical Patriarchate. After the death of Noli, in March 1965, attempts were made (1966-1967), to reconcile the two groups, but to no avail.

Situation from 1992 until today 
In November 1990, the Albanian government, influenced by international changes, decided to ease measures against religion. In June 1992 the Exarch of the Patriarchate of Constantinople, Anastas Janullatos, was elected Archbishop of Tirana, Durrës and all Albania, through many difficulties, began the resurrection from the ruins of Autocephalous Orthodox Church of Albania.

In 1998, 31 years after its reorganization in 1967, the formation of the Holy Synod of Autocephalous Orthodox Church of Albania became possible again, after several years of negotiations between the representatives of the Ecumenical Patriarchate, the Church of Albania, and the authorities of the Albanian Government.

The enthronement of Ignatius, Metropolitan of Berat, Vlora, Kanina, and all of Myzeqe, took place on Saturday, 18 July 1998, in the city of Berat. Anastasius, Archbishop of Tirana, Durrës and all of Albania presided over the service, together with the two representatives of the Ecumenical Patriarchate, Evangelos, Metropolitan of Perga and Meliton, Metropolitan and Philadelphia.

That afternoon, Archbishop Anastasios and Metropolitan Ignat together created the first nucleus of the Holy Synod. Joined by two representatives of the Ecumenical Patriarchate, they held an extraordinary meeting of the Holy Synod in Tirana. These two representatives have been involved in negotiations on this issue with the Albanian authorities since 1992. During this historic meeting, the Holy Synod faced the most urgent problems regarding the Church of Albania. Resignations previously accepted by Alexander, former Metropolitan of Gjirokastra and by Kristodhuli, former Metropolitan of Korça.

Archimandrite Joan Pelushi was elected Metropolitan of Korça]. He has previously served as lecturer and dean of the Theological Academy of the Albanian Orthodox Church. He graduated from the Orthodox Faculty of Theology "Honorary Cross" in America, with the degree of Master of Divinity. Elected Bishop of Apollonia was the Reverend Father Kozma Qirjo. He was 77 years old and represented the early generation of priests, who heroically continued to baptize and perform Divine Liturgy secretly even during the wild years of religious persecution.

The Archbishop Anastas together with Metropolitans Meliton and Ignat, presided over the handover of the Metropolitan of Korça, in front of a large number of believers at orthodoxalbania.net/index.php/al/vepra-ndertuese/2811-tirane Cathedral of the Evangelization in Tirana, on 20 July. Representatives of the Ecumenical Patriarchate left for Constantinople the next day. On 23 July, Archbishop Anastasios, together with Metropolitans Ignatius and Joan, presided over the handover of the Bishop of Apollonia. Father Jani Trebicka was appointed General Secretary of the Holy Synod of the Autocephalous Orthodox Church of Albania.

On 11 August 2000, Kozma Qirjo died, and was replaced as Bishop of Apollonia by Archbishop Anastasios, who also acts as Viceroy of the Metropolitan of Gjirokastra. Following all the above developments, the Holy Synod of the Autocephalous Orthodox Church of Albania became Archbishop Anastasios, President; Metropolitan of Berat Ignati, Metropolitan of Korça Joani. Chief Secretary, Father Jani Trebicka.

In November 2006 the Synod was supplemented with three other hierarchs: the Metropolitan of Gjirokastra, Hirësi Dhimitri, who in the previous 15 years had served as the Archbishop's overseer in this metropolis; Bishop of Apollonia Hirësi Nikolla and Bishop of Kruja, Hirësi Andoni, who both belong to the generation of young Albanian clergy formed at the Orthodox Theological Academy "Resurrection of Christ", Durrës.

Also in November 2006 the new Statute of the Autocephalous Orthodox Church of Albania was approved. In November 2008 was signed, according to the Constitution of the Republic of Albania (1998) the Agreement on the regulation of mutual relations between the Autocephalous Orthodox Church of Albania and the Council of Ministers, which was subsequently ratified by the Albanian Parliament and became the law of the Albanian State, with no. 10057, on 22.01. 2009.

Following the proposal of the Clergy-Laity Council, as defined by the new Statute of the Church, on 19 January 2012, at its meeting, the Holy Synod of the Autocephalous Orthodox Church of Albania elected two new titular bishops. Based on the New Statute of the Autocephalous Orthodox Church of Albania (Articles 17, 18), the Holy Synod decided with unanimous votes as Bishop of Amantias, Archimandrite Nathanail Lavrioti and as Bishop of Bylis ], archimandrite Asti Bakallbashi. These auxiliary bishops of the Archbishop are also titular members with full rights in the Holy Synod.

Submissions to the episcopal rank of Bishop of Amantia Mr. Nathanail and the Bishop of Bylis, Mr. Asti, was performed by Archbishop Anastasios, with the participation of the entire Holy Synod, in the church "Evangelization of the Goddess", in Tirana, on 21–22 January 2012. These bishops also cover certain sectors of ecclesiastical life, for example "Supervision of the Monasteries"  by Nathaniel and "Apostolic Deaconry" (Apostolic Service by Asti.

On 11 and 12 March 2016, in the New Monastery of Saint Vlash in Durrës, under the leadership of the Archbishop of Tirana, Durrës and All Albania, Anastasi, was convened the Clergy-Laity Assembly of the Autocephalous Orthodox Church of Albania, consisting of 280 members. It unanimously reviewed and approved the amendment and improvement of some articles of the Statute of the Autocephalous Orthodox Church of Albania, which highlighted, among others, the creation of two new Metropolises, Apollonia and Fier, and Elbasan.

On 7 April 2016, the Holy Synod convened, which approved the amendments to the Statute of the Autocephalous Orthodox Church of Albania. The Holy Synod established two new metropolises: a) The Holy Metropolis of Apollonia and Fier, which includes the district of Fier, the area of Patos and Libofsha, detached from the Metropolitanate of Berat, Kaninë and Vlora; b) The Holy Metropolis of Elbasan, which includes the areas of Elbasan, Slope and Librazhd, separated from the Archdiocese of Tirana and Durrës. In accordance with the Statute, following the proposal of the Clergy-Laity Council, the Holy Synod undertook to fill the vacancies of the newly established Metropolises through regular voting. For the Metropolitanate of Apollonia and Fier, Bishop Nikola (Hyka) of Apollonia was elected. Bishop of Kruja Andoni (Merdani), was elected Metropolitan of Elbasan. The Holy Synod then raised the Diocese of Amantias to the rank of Metropolitan in the person of Bishop Nathanail (Lavrioti, Stergiu). Subsequently, in the chapel of the Holy Trinity in the Synodal Center, the corresponding Great Messages were given.

On 16 April 2016, in the Cathedral of Saint George, in Fier, the Metropolitan of Apollonia and Fier, Nicholas, was enthroned.

On 17 April 2016, in the church of St. Nicholas, in Elbasan, the Metropolitan of Elbasan, Andoni, was enthroned.

With these changes, the Holy Synod of the Autocephalous Orthodox Church of Albania consists of:

 Archbishop Anastasios, President
 Metropolitan of Berat, Ignati
 Metropolitan of Korça, Joani
 Metropolitan of Gjirokastra, Dhimitri
 Metropolitan of Apollonia and Fier, Nikolla
 Metropolitan of Elbasan, Andoni
 Metropolitan of Amantia, Nathanaili;
 Bishop of Byllis, Asti.

References

Sources 
 Kalendari Ortodoks 2013, botim i Kishës Ortodokse Autoqefale të Shqipërisë, Tiranë.
 Kisha Orthodhokse Autoqefale e Shqipërisë
 Sinodi i Shenjtë
 The Holy Synod of Albania
 Statuti i KOASH-it i vitit 1923
 Statuti i KOASH-it i vitit 1929
 Rregullorja e administrimit të përgjithshëm të Kishës (1929)
 Statuti i KOASH-it i vitit 1950 me shtesat e vitit 1996
 Rregullore mbi administrimin e përgjithshëm të KOASh-it, 1955
 Statuti i KOASH-it, 2006
 Civilta Cattolica, 2005

Albanian Orthodox churches
Eastern Orthodoxy in Albania
Eastern Orthodoxy in Europe